Ali Frioui (born 22 April 1993) was a Tunisian football goalkeeper who currently plays for CA Bizertin.

References

1993 births
Living people
Tunisian footballers
JS Kairouan players
CA Bizertin players
Association football goalkeepers
Tunisian Ligue Professionnelle 1 players